Theresa Thornycroft (1853 – July 1947) was an English sculptor and painter.

Biography
Born Theresa Georgina Thornycroft, she was a member of the inventive and artistic branch of the Thornycroft family. Her father was sculptor and engineer Thomas Thornycroft (1815–1885) and her mother, sculptor Mary Francis, who worked under both her maiden name and her married name (1814–1895). Theresa's brother Sir Hamo Thornycroft RA, sisters Alyce Thornycroft and Helen Thornycroft were artists, her brother Sir John Isaac Thornycroft was the founder of the Thornycroft shipbuilding company. and her niece was the naval architect Blanche Thornycroft.

A gifted artist, she exhibited her paintings at the Royal Academy of Arts in London before she turned twenty-two.

She married Alfred Ezra Sassoon (1861–1895) of the Jewish Sassoon family. Because she was Anglo-Catholic, he was disinherited by the Sassoon family for marrying her. They had three sons:
 Michael Thornycroft Sassoon (1884–1969).
Siegfried Sassoon (1886–1967).
Hamo Watts Sassoon (1887–1915).

In 1890, Alfred left Theresa, apparently infatuated with the American writer, Julia Constance Fletcher; he continued to see the children occasionally until his death, aged 33, in 1895, in East Sussex, from tuberculosis, and she continued to live in the village of Matfield in Kent, and was immortalised in the memoirs of her son Siegfried.

References

Sources

Thornycroft family
1947 deaths
1853 births
English sculptors
19th-century English painters
20th-century English painters
Sassoon family
20th-century British sculptors
19th-century British sculptors